Meyr may refer to:

Meyr (surname)
Meyr, Iran